Andrew Munro is a former Grenadian international football player and head coach of the Grenada national football team.

As a player, he was involved in the 1998 FIFA World Cup qualification campaign.

Munro was placed in charge of the national team for their 2017 Caribbean Cup qualification campaign.

References

1963 births
Grenadian footballers
Grenada international footballers
Living people
Association footballers not categorized by position